Vladimir Samokish (September 20, 1975, Tomsk) is a Russian  entrepreneur, political figure and deputy of the 8th State Duma. From 1993 to 2009, he worked as an individual entrepreneur and actively engaged in business. In 2009 he was appointed Deputy Governor of Tomsk Oblast. In 2015, he was elected deputy of the Tomsk City Duma. Since September 2021, he has served as deputy of the 8th State Duma.

In 2018, Samokish became the richest deputy of the Tomsk City Duma.

Samokish is married and has twins.

He is one of the 324 members of the State Duma the United States Treasury sanctioned on 24 March 2022 in response to the 2022 Russian invasion of Ukraine.

References

1975 births
Living people
United Russia politicians
21st-century Russian politicians
Eighth convocation members of the State Duma (Russian Federation)
Russian individuals subject to the U.S. Department of the Treasury sanctions